Chimi may refer to:

Foods 
 Chimi burger, a sandwich from the Dominican Republic
 Chimichanga, a deep-fried burrito
 Chimichurri, a condiment made using parsley

Other uses 
 Chimi Eyewear, a Swedish-based eyewear brand